Kathmandu is a 2012 Israeli television miniseries depicting the lives of a Chabad Hasidic Jewish family living in Kathmandu, Nepal. The series included 13  episodes and was produced by the Israeli company Reshet.

The main characters of the series are "Shmulik" (Michael Moshonov) and "Mushkie" (Nitzan Levartovsky) and are based on the lives of Rabbi Chezki Lifshitz and Rebbetzin Chani Lifshitz who are the Chabad emissaries in Nepal.

See also 
 Gut Shabbes Vietnam
 Judaism in Nepal

External links
 Series in youtube

References 

Films about Orthodox and Hasidic Jews
Films about Chabad
Television shows filmed in Nepal
Television shows set in Nepal
Culture of Kathmandu